Shipka Pass (el. 1150 m./3820 ft.) is a scenic mountain pass through the Balkan Mountains in Bulgaria. It marks the border between Stara Zagora province and Gabrovo province.  The pass connects the towns of Gabrovo and Kazanlak. The pass is part of the Bulgarka Nature Park.

The pass is 13 km by road north of the small town of Shipka.  It is crossed by a national road I-5, which runs between Ruse, on the Danube River, and Makaza border crossing to Greece.

A road also leads from the pass to the summit of Buzludzha, 12 km to the east.

Battle of Shipka Pass

During the Russo-Turkish War in 1877 and 1878, Shipka Pass was the scene of a series of conflicts collectively named the Battle of Shipka Pass, fought between the Russians, aided by Bulgarian volunteers, and the Ottoman Empire.

Shipka Monument
 It was opened with a ceremony in 1934 and designed by architect Atanas Donkov and sculptor Aleksandar Andreev. An important influence was the Monument to the Battle of the Nations in Germany.

The monument is a 31.5-metre (98-foot) high stone tower in the form of a truncated pyramid. A giant bronze lion, 8 m (26 feet) long and 4 m (13 feet) high, stands above the entrance to the tower, and a figure of a woman represents the victory over the Ottoman forces. A marble sarcophagus housing some of the remains of the Russian and Bulgarian casualties is on the first floor. There are four other floors where one can find replicas of Bulgarian military flags and other relics. The top of the tower reveals a panorama of Shipka Peak and the surrounding area.

Gallery

See also
Battles of the Russo-Turkish War (1877–1878)
Bulgarka Nature Park
Epic of the Forgotten by Ivan Vazov
Etar Architectural-Ethnographic Complex
Heroes of Shipka
History of Bulgaria
Gabrovo City

References

External links

Shipka museum official web site - Bulgarian Ministry of Culture.

Mountain passes of Bulgaria
Balkan mountains
Landforms of Stara Zagora Province
Landforms of Gabrovo Province
Tourist attractions in Stara Zagora Province
Tourist attractions in Gabrovo Province